The Thomas Carr Farmstead Site (Keeler Site RI-707) is a historic archaeological site in Jamestown, Rhode Island.  Located in the vicinity of Tashtassuc Road (the connector road paralleling Rhode Island Route 138) and Eldred Avenue, the site was the farmstead for the locally prominent Carr family from the late 18th century into the 19th century.

The site added to the National Register of Historic Places in 1984.

See also

National Register of Historic Places listings in Newport County, Rhode Island

References

Archaeological sites in Rhode Island
Jamestown, Rhode Island
National Register of Historic Places in Newport County, Rhode Island
Archaeological sites on the National Register of Historic Places in Rhode Island